Olivia Edward (born January 25, 2007) is an American actress best known for her role as Duke in the FX television series Better Things. She began her career at the age of two and has appeared in numerous guest spots on TV series such as Unbreakable Kimmy Schmidt and The Mysteries of Laura. The casting director for Better Things helped Edward to obtain a reoccurring role on the series Crazy Ex-Girlfriend on The CW. 

Edward also dances and sings.

She has said that she is inspired by watching Pamela Adlon direct and act in Better Things.

References

External links 
 

2007 births
American child actresses
Living people
People from Long Island
American television actresses
21st-century American actresses